The 1951 Pittsburgh Panthers football team represented the University of Pittsburgh in the 1951 college football season.  The team compiled a 3–7 record under head coach Tom Hamilton.

Schedule

References

Pittsburgh Panthers
Pittsburgh Panthers football seasons
Pittsburgh Panthers football